Steel Azin Iranian Holding Co. is an Iranian holding company headquartered in Tehran, Iran.  The company engages in the power generation, energy, petrochemicals, steel, agribusiness, construction, investment and sport and leisure sectors.

Main subsidiaries and operations
Steel Azin Co. — Decor
Nayband Bay Agroindustrial Co. — Largest shrimp farm complex in the Persian Gulf region
MABDA Drinking Water - Mineral water production
Electric power generation — including a combined cycle power plant in Damghan, Semnan
Bitumen production — Factory located in Eshtehard Industrial Zone (Karaj County, Alborz Province)
Steel Azin Cultural & Athletic Club — with football, futsal and wrestling teams
Steel Azin Iranian Applied Science University

References

External links
 

Holding companies of Iran